Stanley Klein may refer to:

 Stanley H. Klein (1908-1992), American architect
 Stanley A. Klein, American neuroscientist